The Mefjord (Mefjorden) is a small fjord in the municipality of Sandefjord in Vestfold, Norway. It is a 9 km long fjord which lies in-between Vesterøya (West Island) and Østerøya (East Island). It is a narrow fjord with many minor islands and islets. There are many vacation homes on both sides of the fjord and a large campground, Strand Leirsted, is located on its east side. A vast number of vacation homes can be found along the Mefjord. Several islands in the fjord are also home to vacation homes, including Grindholmen-, Storholmen- and Brattholmen Islands.

It was previously known as Midtfjorden. During the Viking Age, a royal lodge (kongsseter) was located at Geirstad (Gjekstad) in the innermost part of the fjord. It is also the fjord used when burying Olav Geirstadr-Alv and the Gokstad Ship in the 9th century.

References

Fjords of Vestfold og Telemark
Sandefjord